Judd Milo Ehrlich (born August 17, 1971) is an American documentary film director and producer. In 2016, The New York Times said "Ehrlich, an Emmy-winning documentarian, clearly knows his craft."

His works as director include Keepers of the Game (2016 Tribeca Film Festival premiere), Notes from Liberia (winner at the 2015 RiverRun International Film Festival), We Could Be King (winner of the 2015 Emmy Award for Outstanding Sports Documentary and Grand Clio Award for Integrated Marketing), Magic Camp (winner at the 2012 Newport Beach Film Festival for Outstanding Achievement in Filmmaking), Run for Your Life (2008 Tribeca Film Festival premiere, nominated for a 2010 Emmy Award for Outstanding Achievement Documentary), Mayor of the West Side (nominated for a 2008 Emmy Award for Outstanding Achievement Documentary).

Life and career 
Ehrlich was born in New York City, New York, the son of a schoolteacher and an architect. He grew up in the Flatiron District. After attending the Dalton School, Ehrlich earned his bachelor's degree from Vassar College.

At fourteen, Ehrlich was the youngest feature reporter on a New York newspaper and later editor-in-chief of his high school paper. Before film, he worked as a caseworker in New York City with homeless adults and families and developmentally disabled teens at Project Renewal, Homes for the Homeless and YAI. Ehrlich began filming one of his clients, which would later become his first film, Mayor of the West Side.

Ehrlich began working in documentary in the Judson Memorial Church basement on the Steenbeck editing of the 1997 Sundance Film Festival award-winner, Family Name, directed by Macky Alston. He moved to the editing room of the 2000 Emmy and DuPont-Columbia award-winning series New York: A Documentary Film directed by of Ric Burns. Ehrlich worked for the POV series and was an editor and producer at CBS News. He curated and directed film programs and series at BAMcinématek, Brooklyn College, JCC in Manhattan and the Brooklyn Museum, hosting notables including Darren Aronofsky, Steve Buscemi, Tony Kushner, Cyndi Lauper and Willem Dafoe.

Ehrlich is Jewish and attended the Hebrew University of Jerusalem during his junior year of college, where he studied philosophy with Paul R. Mendes-Flohr. While studying abroad, Ehrlich marched from Auschwitz to Birkenau in the March of the Living.

Ehrlich ran the 2008 New York City Marathon in support of Fred's Team and Memorial Sloan Kettering Cancer Center, founded by Fred Lebow, the subject of his film Run for Your Life. The film screened on a transatlantic crossing of the Queen Mary 2 as part of the Tribeca Film Festival curated Cunard Insights program. He attended Tannen's Magic Camp when he was twelve, along with Adrien Brody and David Blaine, and returned to film the documentary Magic Camp.

Ehrlich's films Keepers of the Game and We Could Be King were produced in partnership with Tribeca Digital Studios (TDS) and the Dick's Sporting Goods (DSG) Foundation, forging a new model for documentary production. As the centerpiece of DSG's Sports Matter campaign, the films helped raise over five million dollars and save several hundred youth sports programs across the United States. The films premiered at the Tribeca Film Festival and were later broadcast on ABC and ESPN. Among those attending the premieres were Michael B. Jordan, Victor Cruz, Serena Williams, Missy Franklin, Paul Rabil, Tom Brady and Robert De Niro. During production, Ehrlich lived for six months on the Akwesasne Mohawk Territory and in Northwest Philadelphia. We Could Be King was selected as part of the American Film Showcase, funded by the United States Department of State, which screens films worldwide to foster U.S. diplomatic relations. Ehrlich also produced two five-part TV mini-series with TDS and DSG, which broadcast nightly on SportsCenter.

Ehrlich is represented for branded content by Saville, joining a roster of directors that includes Michael Apted, Wim Wenders, Barry Levinson, Oliver Stone and Werner Herzog. He has directed for Bose (with Russell Wilson, Chuck Pagano and J.J. Watt), Tough Mudder, Major League Soccer, Van Cleef & Arpels, Barilla, U.S. Cellular and the Serena Williams Fund.

Ehrlich is president of Flatbush Pictures, which produces independent films, documentaries, branded content and mini-series. He founded the company with the late cinematographer Ryo Murakami who filmed inside the Firestone Rubber Plantation in Liberia. His footage posthumously became the documentary Notes from Liberia and the inspiration for the narrative film Out of My Hand, also filmed by Murakami. Footage from the documentary was licensed for use in the Emmy Award-winning 2014 Frontline and ProPublica documentary Firestone and the Warlord. The company is named for Flatbush, Brooklyn, where Ehrlich resides. His great-grandfather, Julius Nelson, emigrated from Russia and settled in Flatbush. Nelson built the eponymously named Nelson Tower, designed by H. Craig Severance. Three years after opening, the building sold in foreclosure proceedings due to the impact of the Great Depression. Ehrlich's grandparents and mother were born and raised in Flatbush. The logo of Flatbush Pictures is an homage to the Vitagraph Studios smokestack.

Filmography (as Director) 
 Mayor of the West Side (2006)
 Run for Your Life (2008)
 Magic Camp (2012)
 We Could Be King (2014)
 Notes from Liberia (2015)
 Keepers of the Game (2016)
 Father K (2018)
 The Price of Freedom (2021)

References

External links 
 

American documentary filmmakers
Television producers from New York City
Living people
Businesspeople from New York City
1971 births
Vassar College alumni
Film directors from New York City
People from the Flatiron District, Manhattan